The year 2006 is the 5th year in the history of the Cage Rage Championships, a mixed martial arts promotion based in the United Kingdom. In 2006 Cage Rage Championships held 8 events, Cage Rage 15.

Title fights

Events list

Cage Rage 15

Cage Rage 15 was an event held on February 4, 2006 at The Wembley Conference Centre in London, United Kingdom.

Results

Cage Rage 16

Cage Rage 16 was an event held on April 22, 2006 at The Wembley Conference Centre in London, United Kingdom.

Results

Cage Rage Contenders

Cage Rage Contenders was an event held on May 28, 2006 at Caesar's Nightclub in Streatham, United Kingdom.

Results

Cage Rage 17

Cage Rage 17 was an event held on July 1, 2006 at Wembley Arena in London, United Kingdom.

Results

Cage Rage Contenders 2

Cage Rage Contenders 2 was an event held on August 20, 2006 at Caesar's Nightclub in Streatham, United Kingdom.

Results

Cage Rage 18

Cage Rage 18 was an event held on September 30, 2006 at Wembley Arena in London, United Kingdom.

Results

Cage Rage Contenders 3

Cage Rage Contenders 3 was an event held on November 12, 2006 at Hammersmith Palais in London, United Kingdom.

Results

Cage Rage 19

Cage Rage 19 was an event held on December 9, 2006 at Earls Court Exhibition Centre in London, United Kingdom.

Results

See also 
 List of Cage Rage champions
 List of Cage Rage events

References

Cage Rage Championships events
2006 in mixed martial arts